Thrandina is a genus of jumping spiders, with three species found in Ecuador. It is unique among New World salticids in having strikingly large posterior median eyes.

Description
Thrandina and its sister genus Galianora share the ancestral salticid traits of a tarsal claw on the female palpus and a median apophysis on the male palp. This is rare among neotropical salticids. Both genera are informally grouped as "lapsiines", together with Lapsias. However, the shared basal characteristics with Lapsias could be symplesiomorphic.

Their carapace is dark brown to black, except for a central pale longitudinal stripe on the thorax. The legs are pale to medium brown, with a darker femur I. The abdomen is medium brown with lighter chevrons above, and pale below with dark speckles. It looks like the male, but with more annulate legs.

Males walk fluid but hesitantly, frequently pausing and then raising and lowering.their first two pairs of legs in synchrony. A similar gait is observed in Spartaeinae.

Species
 Thrandina bellavista (Maddison, 2012)
 Thrandina cosanga (Maddison, 2012)
 Thrandina parocula (Maddison, 2006)

Name
The genus is a contraction of Thranduil, the king of Mirkwood elves in J.R.R. Tolkien's mythology, which, as Thrandina, inhabit shady forests, and andina, referring to the Andean habitat.

The species name refers to the relatively equal sizes of the lateral and posterior eyes.

Footnotes

References
  (2006): New lapsiine jumping spiders from Ecuador (Araneae: Salticidae). Zootaxa 1255: 17-28. PDF (with picture of male)
  (2007): The world spider catalog, version 8.0. American Museum of Natural History.

External links
 Video of walking male Thrandina parocula

Salticidae
Invertebrates of Ecuador
Salticidae genera
Spiders of South America